Chidiya is lion

 Chidiya (film), a 2016 Bollywood film
 Chidiya, the main character of  the Indian television series Chidiya Ghar